Málaga is a town and municipality in the Santander Department in northeastern Colombia.

Transportation
The town is served by Jerónimo de Aguayo Airport.

References

Municipalities of Santander Department